Francis Joseph Aloysius O'Keeffe (11 May 1896 – 26 March 1924) was an Australian first-class cricketer who played for New South Wales and Victoria.  He was born in Waverley, Sydney.

O'Keeffe played Sydney Grade Cricket for Waverley as a teenager before enlisting in the First Australian Imperial Force and serving for four years in World War I. After the war he was selected for a few matches for New South Wales, but was unable to establish himself in the team, and moved to Victoria in 1921.

He came to fame in the 1921-22 season when he made 87 and 79 for Victoria against New South Wales, 180 against South Australia and 177 and 144 for The Rest against Warwick Armstrong's touring team, newly returned from their Ashes triumph in England.

A good off-break bowler in addition to his powerful batting, O'Keeffe was engaged by the Church club in the Lancashire League and planned to qualify for Lancashire. He led the League's batting averages in 1923. He fell ill with peritonitis and died in a Hampstead hospital in March 1924.

In a mere nine first-class games he scored 926 runs at 71.23 and took 12 wickets at 19.16 with a best of 5 for 45. He was credited in Melbourne for inventing the practice of fielders walking in as the bowler ran in to bowl. Previously run-saving fielders had tended to stay static.

See also
 List of Victoria first-class cricketers
 List of New South Wales representative cricketers

References

External links
 

1896 births
1924 deaths
Australian cricketers
Cricketers from Sydney
New South Wales cricketers
Victoria cricketers
Deaths from peritonitis
Military personnel from New South Wales
Australian military personnel of World War I
Australian expatriate cricketers in the United Kingdom